Đorđe Genčić (16 November 1861 – 19 October 1938) was a Serbian and Yugoslav industrialist and politician. He served as the Mayor of Niš (1894-1899), Minister of Internal Affairs (1899-1900) and the Minister of National Economy (1903). He was a political leader of the May Coup which brought an end to the Obrenović dynasty.

Biography 
Genčić was born in the village of Veliki Izvor near Zaječar in 1861 to a rich family. After finishing high school studies in Zaječar and Belgrade, he studied economics in Vienna and later he went to Russia after being invited by Mikhail Chernyayev to study military sciences. After a few years, he was made a Russian guard officer, and during his service in the Russian Army, he was promoted to the rank of captain.

References

1861 births
1938 deaths
19th-century industrialists
Yugoslav politicians
Mayors of Niš
Interior ministers of Serbia

People from Zaječar
20th-century industrialists